The Woolley River is a river of the West Coast Region of New Zealand's South Island. It initially flows east before turning north to reach the Maruia River close to the settlement of Maruia.

See also
List of rivers of New Zealand

References

Rivers of the West Coast, New Zealand
Rivers of New Zealand